Frederick Cecil Smith (30 October 1904 – 1977) was a Welsh professional footballer who played as a centre forward in the Football League for Burnley, Wrexham, Wigan Borough and Cardiff City.

Personal life 
Smith's brother Arthur was also a footballer.

Career statistics

References

1904 births
1977 deaths
Footballers from Wrexham
Welsh footballers
Association football forwards
Oswestry Town F.C. players
Welshpool Town F.C. players
Wrexham A.F.C. players
Wigan Borough F.C. players
Notts County F.C. players
Macclesfield Town F.C. players
Stalybridge Celtic F.C. players
Burnley F.C. players
Cardiff City F.C. players
Rhyl F.C. players
Bangor City F.C. players
English Football League players